I Kalomira Paei Cinema is a concept album by the popular Greek-American singer Kalomira that was released on December 7, 2006 by Heaven Music. The album contains many popular classic songs from the old Greek Cinema. These songs have been performed by many Greek movie stars like Aliki Vougiouklaki. The album contains also a karaoke DVD. The album failed to match the success of her two previous albums. No singles were produced from the album.

Track listing

 "Rikο Riko Rikoko (Τ΄ Agori Mou)" – 2:56
 "Thelo Ta Opa Mou" – 3:27
 "Makia Makia" – 2:51
 "Afto To Mambo To Brazilero" – 3:49
 "Crazy Girl" – 2:44
 "Eimai Koritsi Zoriko" – 2:44
 "Eklapsa Hthes" – 3:38
 "S’ Agapo S' Oles Tis Glosses" – 2:36
 "Aliki Tsa Tsa Tsa" – 2:44
 "Sou To’ Pa Mia Kai Dio Kai Tris" – 3:15
 "Tou Agoriou Apenanti" – 2:46
 "Laos Kai Kolonaki" – 3:39
 "Vrehei Pali Apopse" – 2:48
 "Fountoukaki Mou" – 3:07

Chart performance

References

2006 albums
Concept albums
Covers albums
Greek-language albums
Heaven Music albums
Kalomira albums